Sixeonotus is a genus of plant bugs in the family Miridae. There are more than 30 described species in Sixeonotus.

Species
These 36 species belong to the genus Sixeonotus:

 Sixeonotus acuminatus Carvalho & Carpintero, 1986
 Sixeonotus albicornis Blatchley, 1926
 Sixeonotus albohirtus Knight, 1926
 Sixeonotus andinus Carvalho & Gomes, 1971
 Sixeonotus areolatus Knight, 1928
 Sixeonotus basicornis Knight, 1928
 Sixeonotus bebbiae Knight, 1968
 Sixeonotus brailovskyi Carvalho, 1985
 Sixeonotus brasiliensis Carvalho & Gomes, 1971
 Sixeonotus brevirostris Knight, 1928
 Sixeonotus brevis Knight, 1926
 Sixeonotus capitatus Carvalho & Carpintero, 1986
 Sixeonotus carmelitanus Carvalho, 1990
 Sixeonotus chapadensis Carvalho & Carpintero, 1986
 Sixeonotus deflatus Knight, 1926
 Sixeonotus dextratus Knight, 1928
 Sixeonotus gracilis Blatchley, 1928
 Sixeonotus insignis Reuter, 1876
 Sixeonotus jujuiensis Carvalho & Carpintero, 1990
 Sixeonotus manauara Carvalho, 1985
 Sixeonotus minensis Carvalho, 1985
 Sixeonotus moestus Reuter, 1908
 Sixeonotus morio Reuter, 1908
 Sixeonotus nicaraguensis Carvalho, 1990
 Sixeonotus nicholi Knight, 1928
 Sixeonotus nocturnus (Distant, 1893)
 Sixeonotus perobscurus (Distant, 1893)
 Sixeonotus pusillus Knight, 1928
 Sixeonotus recurvatus Knight, 1929
 Sixeonotus rostratus Knight, 1928
 Sixeonotus rubellus Reuter, 1908
 Sixeonotus saltensis Carvalho & Carpintero, 1986
 Sixeonotus scabrosus (Uhler, 1895)
 Sixeonotus strigatifrons Reuter, 1908
 Sixeonotus tenebrosus (Distant, 1893)
 Sixeonotus unicolor Knight, 1928

References

Further reading

 
 
 

Articles created by Qbugbot
Eccritotarsini 
Miridae genera